Biyani Institute of Science and Management (BISMA) is a private girls college in Jaipur run by Biyani Educational society in the State of Rajasthan, India. Biyani Educational society is registered under the Rajasthan Society Registration Act, 1958 having Reg. No. 500/Jaipur/1997-98.

Recognition
The Institution is affiliated with Rajasthan Technical University, Kota.  The Institution is also approved by All India Council for Technical Education.

Campus
The Institute has campus in Vidyadhar nagar, Jaipur, Rajasthan, India.

References

External links 
 Biyani Institute

Women's engineering colleges in India
Engineering colleges in Jaipur
Women's universities and colleges in Jaipur
Educational institutions established in 1997
1997 establishments in Rajasthan